Fitzroy Island Light is an inactive lighthouse on Fitzroy Island, a continental island  southeast of Cairns, Queensland, Australia. It was only active between 1973 and 1992 but, together with Little Fitzroy Island Light, there has been a light station in the area since 1929. Fitzroy Island lighthouse now serves as a visitor centre for the Fitzroy Island National Park.

History

The first station in the area was established on nearby Little Fitzroy Island in 1929, to warn ships in the Grafton Passage of the reefs around the island. The station on Fitzroy Island was established in 1943, during World War II, to supplement the Little Fitzroy Island Light.

The light characteristic shown by the 1943 light was unique in Australia, and perhaps in the world, in that the characteristic seen (and not just the light colour) was dependent on the direction, corresponding to different Morse code signals. In the direction 217°, the middle of the channel, it showed a group of four flashes every 16 seconds. North of that direction, the first two flashes looked like a single long flash, resulting in one long flash followed by two short flashes, i.e. a Morse code "D" (go down). South of 217°, it would show two short flashes followed by a long flash, i.e. a Morse code "U" (go up). That was achieved by using two synchronised rotating bullseye lens panels, which had been taken from the first-order lens formerly at Cape Northumberland Lighthouse .

In 1973, the present Fitzroy Island lighthouse was constructed, being the fifth of a group of seven concrete towers erected in Queensland between 1964 and 1979. In order of construction, they were Cape Capricorn Light, New Caloundra Light, Point Danger Light, New Burnett Heads Light, Fitzroy Island Light, Point Cartwright Light and Archer Point Light. At that same time, the Little Fitzroy Island Light was deactivated. The light source was an array of sealed beam lamps.

In 1992, the Fitzroy Island lighthouse was deactivated, and Little Fitzroy Island Light made active again after a re-build. The lighthouse on Fitzroy Island now serves as a visitor centre for the Fitzroy Island National Park.

Structures
The lighthouse is octagonal in form, topped with a lantern and a gallery. It is made of concrete and covered with tiles, much like Point Cartwright Light and New Burnett Heads Light.

The site also includes several preserved lighthouse keeper cottages and auxiliary buildings.

Site operation and visiting

Fitzroy Island is accessible by ferry from Cairns, and the lighthouse is a  hike from the ferry landing. The site is open, although the tower is closed to the public. It is operated by the Queensland Parks and Wildlife Service as part of the Fitzroy Island National Park. The unique 1943 light is on display in the lighthouse office. The lamp from the last lighthouse is on display at the Cairns Historical Society Museum.

See also

List of lighthouses in Australia

Notes

References

External links

Lighthouses completed in 1973
Lighthouses in Queensland
Buildings and structures in Far North Queensland
1973 establishments in Australia
Queensland in World War II
Tourist attractions in Far North Queensland